Joachim Wuermeling (born 19 July 1960 in Münster) a German politician of the Christian Social Union in Bavaria. Between 2005 and 2008, he served as State Secretary for the European Union in the German Federal Ministry for Economics and Technology.

Education
 1985: First state law examination
 1987: Doctor of law
 1989: Second state law examination
 1990: Master of comparative, European and international law at the European University Institute in Florence

Early career
 since 1996: Lecturer of the University of Potsdam
 since 2000: Lawyer
 1989-1993: European affairs officer, Bavaria Office, Bonn
 1993-1999: Section head, European affairs division, Bavarian State Chancellery, Munich
 1993-1995: Staff Member of the Commissioner Schmidhuber's private office, Brussels

Political career
 since 1996: Member of the Upper Franconia CSU District Executive
 since 1997: Member of the CSU European affairs committee
 since 1998: Member of the CSU Party Committee
 since 1999: Member of the CSU Policy and Drafting Commissions
 since 2000: District Chairman of the Upper Franconia CSU Lawyers

Member of the European Parliament, 1999–2005
From 1999 to 2005, Wuermeling was a Member of the European Parliament for Bavaria with the Christian Social Union in Bavaria,
part of the European People's Party and served on the European Parliament's Committee on the Internal Market and Consumer Protection.

During his time in the Parliament, Wuermeling was a substitute for the Committee on Constitutional Affairs, a member of the Delegation to the EU-Bulgaria Joint Parliamentary Committee and a substitute for the Delegation for relations with the Gulf States, including Yemen. Most notably, he was the Parliament’s rapporteur on the Consumer Credit Directive.

Other roles included:
 1999-2005: Member of the European Parliament
 1999-2001: Vice-Chairman of the Delegation to Estonia
 2002-2003: Substitute Member of the European Parliament Delegation to the European Convention
 2002-2004: EPP Deputy coordinator, Committee on Constitutional Affairs

State Secretary, 2005–2008
Following the 2005 German elections, Wuermeling was appointed State Secretary at the Federal Ministry for Economics and Technology. under minister Michael Glos in the first cabinet of Chancellor Angela Merkel. In this capacity, he was primarily in charge of energy issues. He also served as the government’s coordinator for EU policies and held a key role during Germany’s presidency of the Council of the European Union in 2007.

In early 2008, Glos put Wuermeling in temporary retirement from government employment and replaced him with Jochen Homann.

Life after politics
Between 2005 and 2011, Wuermeling served as member of the Executive Board of the German Insurance Association (GDV), where he was in charge of European and international affairs. In this capacity, he was also a member of the European Economic and Social Committee. 
	
From 2011 to 2016, Wuermeling served as chairman of the Association of Sparda Banks, a group of twelve regional cooperative banks in Germany.

In July 2016, following a proposal of Bavaria, the Bundesrat nominated Wuermeling as member of the Executive Board of the Deutsche Bundesbank.

Other activities
 House of Finance, Goethe University Frankfurt, Member of the Board of Trustees
 Leibniz Institute for Financial Research (SAFE), Member of the Policy Council 
 Research Institute for Application-Oriented Knowledge Processing (FAW), Member of the Board of Trustees
 Institute for European Politics (IEP), Member of the Board of Trustees
 Rotary International, Member

References

External links
 
 
 Web-site of German Federal Ministry of Economic and Technology (German, with link to English version in the navigation bar)

1960 births
Living people
MEPs for Germany 2004–2009
Christian Social Union in Bavaria MEPs
MEPs for Germany 1999–2004